La Represa is a corregimiento in La Chorrera District, Panamá Oeste Province, Panama with a population of 681 as of 2010. Its population as of 1990 was 650; its population as of 2000 was 696. Most recently, its population was recorded as 796 in 2015.

References

Corregimientos of Panamá Oeste Province